The School of Reis is a film theory concept relative to the teachings of Portuguese director António Reis, to his work, conceived with his wife Margarida Cordeiro, and to the works of the directors influenced by theirs. It is a pun on the surname of António Reis, since  in Portuguese also means "kings".

Origin of the Term
The term School of Reis was coined by film historian Haden Guest, director of the Harvard Film Archive, when referring to the influence exerted by the school of thought of Portuguese director António Reis through his didactics at his classes as professor of the Portuguese National Filmschool, from 1977 to 1991, over generations of future Portuguese directors who learned under Reis' mentoring.

The term Reisian is sometimes applied in a similar fashion as Fordian or Tarkovskian, relative to the style of both the American director John Ford or the Russian director Andrey Tarkovsky.

The Teachings of António Reis
António Reis taught classes at the Portuguese National Film School, such as Filmic Space, in 1977, and later Film Analysis, History of Image, Direction of Actors and Introduction to the Study of Image.

One of the characteristics of his teaching method was that it was almost exclusively oral, existing very few written materials retaining his theory, in what could be stated to be a reflex of António Reis' beliefs in the ancient oral tradition.

One of the most recognizable aspects of António Reis' aesthetics was his structuring of the cinematographical unity around the exploration of the limits of the possibilities of the match cut producing visual rhymes, associations and understated meanings, clearly identifiable in works of his like Jaime or Trás-os-Montes.

Influence and Heirs of the School of Reis
António Reis' works had a major impact on the practices of contemporaries of his like Manoel de Oliveira, whom Reis assisted in his second feature, Rite of Spring, in 1963; Paulo Rocha, having Reis written the script for his feature Change of Life; or João César Monteiro, whose quotations of Reis are clear in films as Recollections of the Yellow House, God's Comedy or Silvestre.

However, Dennis Lim, in his article for the magazine Artforum, points out that "for today’s preeminent Portuguese filmmakers, no single figure has been more influential than António Reis." Through his teachings, Reis has had a major impact in the work of subsequent filmmakers of whom he was a professor, as Joaquim Sapinho, Vítor Gonçalves, Pedro Costa, Manuela Viegas and João Pedro Rodrigues. Some of them, like Sapinho, Gonçalves or Viegas are today professors at the Escola Superior de Teatro e Cinema, the current name for the former Portuguese National Film School.

Film Program
The film program known by The School of Reis: The Films and Legacy of António Reis and Margarida Cordeiro, curated by film scholar Haden Guest, was premiered at the Harvard Film Archive in May 2012, followed by a presence at the Anthology Film Archives in June 2012 and at UCLA Film and Television Archive in July 2012. It was the first complete retrospective of António Reis and Margarida Cordeiro's work outside their native Portugal, and is composed of eleven films:
 Jaime directed by António Reis
 Trás-os-Montes directed by António Reis and Margarida Cordeiro
 Ana directed by António Reis and Margarida Cordeiro
 Sand Rose directed by António Reis and Margarida Cordeiro
 Rite of Spring directed by Manoel de Oliveira
 Change of Life directed by Paulo Rocha
 The Shepherd directed by João Pedro Rodrigues
 This Side of Resurrection directed by Joaquim Sapinho
 Blood directed by Pedro Costa
 Glória directed by Manuela Viegas
 A Girl In Summer directed by Vítor Gonçalves

See also
 Cinema of Portugal
Film studies
Philosophy of film

External links
 Dennis Lim's Under the Influence article at Artforum magazine about The School of Reis
 Gabe Klinger's article Disquieting Objects at the Moving Image Source
 The School of Reis page at the Harvard Film Archive website
 The School of Reis page at the Anthology Film Archives website
 The School of Reis page at the UCLA Film & Television Archive website
 The School of Reis page at the Moving Image Source
 The School of Reis at the New York Times
 The School of Reis at the Time Out New York

References 

Concepts in film theory